Chloroclystis solidifascia is a moth in the family Geometridae. It was described by Louis Beethoven Prout in 1939. It is found on Seram.

References

Moths described in 1929
solidifascia